Lectionary 327 (Gregory-Aland), designated by siglum ℓ 327 (in the Gregory-Aland numbering) is a Greek manuscript of the New Testament, on parchment. Palaeographically it has been assigned to the 14th century. The manuscript has not survived in complete condition.

Description 

The original codex contained lessons from the Gospel of John, Matthew, and Luke (Evangelistarium), with numerous lacunae, on 178 parchment leaves. The leaves are measured.

The text is written in Greek minuscule letters, in two columns per page, 26-30 lines per page.

The codex contains weekday Gospel lessons.

History 

Scrivener and Gregory dated the manuscript to the 14th century. It has been assigned by the Institute for New Testament Textual Research to the 14th-century.

The manuscript was written in Constantinople.

It was purchased from H. Stanhope Freeman in 1862 (along with Lectionary 325, Lectionary 326 and Lectionary 328).

The manuscript was added to the list of New Testament manuscripts by Frederick Henry Ambrose Scrivener (276e) and Caspar René Gregory (number 327e). Gregory saw it in 1883.

The codex is housed at the British Library (Add MS 24379) in London.

The fragment is not cited in critical editions of the Greek New Testament (UBS4, NA28).

See also 

 List of New Testament lectionaries
 Biblical manuscript
 Textual criticism

Notes and references

Bibliography

External links 
 

Greek New Testament lectionaries
14th-century biblical manuscripts
British Library additional manuscripts